Triplophysa arnoldii is a species of stone loach in the genus Triplophysa. It is endemic to Mongolia. It grows to  SL.

Etymology
The fish is named in honor of Lev Vladimirovich Arnoldi (1903-1980), a Russian entomologist, who collected the type specimen.

References

A
Fish of Mongolia
Endemic fauna of Mongolia
Taxa named by Artem Mikhailovich Prokofiev
Fish described in 2006